The Society of British Neurological Surgeons is a medical association for British neurosurgeons.

History
It was formed in 1926, with Sir Geoffrey Jefferson and Professor Norman Dott. Sir Charles Alfred Ballance was the first President. Other founders were Wilfred Trotter, Henry Souttar, Sir Hugh Cairns and Arthur Bankart.

Structure
It is based at the Royal College of Surgeons of England in the London Borough of Camden.

Function
It represents neurosurgery in the UK, and disseminates up-to-date information on the latest procedures, and organises conferences and seminars. It regulates the profession. It publishes the British Journal of Neurosurgery.

See also
 American Neurological Association
 Association of British Neurologists
 Royal Hospital for Neuro-disability

References

External links
 SBNS

Health in the London Borough of Camden
Neurology organizations
Organisations based in the London Borough of Camden
Organizations established in 1926
Surgical organisations based in the United Kingdom
1926 establishments in the United Kingdom